Tiffany Jenkins is a British sociologist, cultural commentator and writer, and is culture editor for the journal Sociology Compass. She is the author of Contesting Human Remains in Museum Collections (2011), which looks at the influences at play on the controversy over human remains in museum collections; and of Keeping Their Marbles (2016), which examines the controversies surrounding the Elgin Marbles, and the wider debate on the repatriation of cultural heritage. She is editor of a multi-authored book of essays, Political Culture, Soft Interventions and Nation Building (2015), which examines the act of cultural intervention in countries that have been devastated by conflict.

She is a regular contributor to the broadsheet press on the arts and cultural issues, including a column for The Scotsman newspaper.

Jenkins has been a visiting fellow at the London School of Economics, and arts and society director of the Institute of Ideas.

Bibliography

References

External links

TMA creative management agency
BBC Radio 4, Forethought, "Judgement at Last", September 2014
BBC Radio 4, Beauty and the Brain, presented by Tiffany Jenkins, January 2014
BBC Radio 4, Start the Week, with Lisa Jardine, James Weatherall, Kenneth Cukier, Tiffany Jenkins and Marcus du Sautoy, February 2013
BBC Radio 4, The Value of Culture Today, with Melvyn Bragg, Christopher Frayling, Matt Ridley, and Tiffany Jenkins, in January 2013

Living people
British sociologists
Museologists
Year of birth missing (living people)
British women non-fiction writers
21st-century British non-fiction writers
21st-century British women writers
21st-century social scientists
British women sociologists